Peter Stuart Lindsay (born 10 October 1951) is a New Zealand coxswain. He competed at the 1972 Summer Olympics in Munich with the men's coxed four where they came sixth.

References

1951 births
Living people 
New Zealand male rowers
Olympic rowers of New Zealand
Rowers at the 1972 Summer Olympics
Sportspeople from Oamaru
Coxswains (rowing)